Lucas Cueto (born 24 March 1996) is a German professional footballer who plays as a forward for Karlsruher SC.

International career
Cueto was born in Germany and is of Spanish descent, and has represented German youth international teams.

References

External links
 

1996 births
Living people
Footballers from Cologne
Association football forwards
German footballers
Germany youth international footballers
German people of Spanish descent
2. Bundesliga players
3. Liga players
Regionalliga players
Swiss Super League players
1. FC Köln II players
1. FC Köln players
FC St. Gallen players
SC Preußen Münster players
FC Viktoria Köln players
Karlsruher SC players
German expatriate footballers
German expatriate sportspeople in Switzerland
Expatriate footballers in Switzerland